The Moroccan Football League Association was a confederation of football compétitions, under the aegis of the North African Football Union.

Since Morocco's independence in 1956, this confederation has ended, giving way to the Royal Moroccan Football Federation.

Club Competitions

Moroccan League
Champions by edition
 1917 : CA de Casablanca
 1918 : USM de Casablanca
 1919 : USM de Casablanca
 1920 : USM de Casablanca
 1921 : Olympique Marocain
 1922 : Olympique Marocain
 1923 : Olympique Marocain
 1924 : Union Fès
 1925 : Olympique Marocain
 1926 : Union Fès
 1927 : US Athlétique de Casablanca
 1928 : Stade Marocain
 1929 : US Athlétique de Casablanca
 1930 : Olympique Marocain
 1931 : Stade Marocain
 1932 : USM de Casablanca
 1933 : USM de Casablanca
 1934 : USM de Casablanca
 1935 : USM de Casablanca
 1936 : Olympique Marocain
 1937 : Olympique Marocain
 1938 : USM de Casablanca
 1939 : USM de Casablanca
 1940 : USM de Casablanca
 1941 : USM de Casablanca
 1942 : USM de Casablanca
 1943 : USM de Casablanca
 1944 : USM de Casablanca
 1945 : Stade Marocain
 1946 : Racing de Casablanca
 1947 : USM de Casablanca
 1948 : Wydad Casablanca
 1949 : Wydad Casablanca
 1950 : Wydad Casablanca
 1951 : Wydad Casablanca
 1952 : USM de Casablanca
 1953 : AS Marrakech
 1954 : Racing de Casablanca
 1955 : Wydad Casablanca
 1956 : *no competition

Honours by club

Moroccan cup
Winners by edition
 1934 : SA Marrakech
 1935 : Racing de Casablanca
 1936 : USM Casablanca
 1937 : US Athlétique de Casablanca
 1938 : SA Marrakech
 1939 : Stade Marocain
 1940 : USM Casablanca
 1941 : USM Casablanca
 1942 : Stade Marocain
 1943 : USM Casablanca
 1944 : USM Casablanca
 1945 : Racing de Casablanca
 1946 : USM Casablanca
 1947 : Stade Marocain
 1948 : *No known
 1949 : *No known
 1950 : *No Known
 1951 : *No known
 1952 : *No known
 1953 : *No known
 1954 : Stade Marocain
 1955 : USM Casablanca
 1956 : *No competition

Honours by club

See also
 Royal Moroccan Football Federation

References

External links 
Honors of the Moroccan Football League

Football leagues in Morocco
Defunct top level football leagues in Africa
football league
Defunct sports leagues in Morocco